Frankley Water Treatment Works is a drinking water plant at Frankley, Birmingham, England. Owned by Severn Trent Water, it supplies drinking water to Birmingham and the surrounding area. The plant treats water from the Elan Valley in Wales, which arrives at Frankley Reservoir by gravity feed along the Elan aqueduct with a gradient of 1 in 2,300.

External links
Description of treatment process
Aerial photograph

Buildings and structures in Birmingham, West Midlands
Water supply and sanitation in England
Water supply in Birmingham, West Midlands